The Punchdrunk Encyclopaedia is a 2019 encyclopedia that covers the history of Punchdrunk. It is edited by Josephine Machon and published by Routledge.

It has been reviewed by The Times Literary Supplement. The book was nominated for the Theatre Book Prize in 2020.

Sections
 Awe and wonder
 Ritual
 Adrenaline

References

Specialized encyclopedias
Routledge books